Fausto 5.0 is a fantasy film made in Spain and released in 2001.

Fausto 5.0 is the last part of a trilogy dedicated to the figure of Faust. The first two instalments were F@ust 3.0 (originally a play) and The Damnation of Faust (originally an opera).  All three films were developed for the screen by La Fura dels Baus, an experimental theatre group from Barcelona.

Plot
A doctor – Fausto – on the verge of a nervous breakdown, meets a former patient – Santos Vella – who promises to grant his every wish. Reality starts dissolving and Fausto begins to lose control.

Awards
 Méliès d'Or Award, 2002 (among others) for the best European fantasy film
 International Fantasy Film Award (Best Film), Fantasporto 2002
 Grand Prize, Gérardmer Film Festival 2002

See also 
 List of Spanish films of 2001

References

External links
 
 

2000s Spanish-language films
Catalan-language films
Spanish fantasy films
Spanish horror films
2001 fantasy films
2001 horror films
Films based on European myths and legends
Films based on Goethe's Faust
2001 films
2000s Spanish films